Army Historical Foundation is the designated fundraising institution for the National Museum of the United States Army.  The foundation also has given out awards to authors of books on military history topics since 1997.  The awards are known as the Army Historical Foundation Distinguished Writing Awards. It publishes the quarterly journal On Point.

Army Historical Foundation Distinguished Writing Awards

The Army Historical Foundation Distinguished Writing Awards are given out to books on Army history as well as to authors of journal articles.

2020 Awards

2019 Awards

References

External links
 Official

American literary awards